Scotinotylus is a genus of sheet weavers that was first described by Eugène Louis Simon in 1884.

Species
 it contains forty-seven species, found in Europe and Asia:
Scotinotylus alienus (Kulczyński, 1885) – Russia, USA (Alaska), Canada
Scotinotylus allocotus Crawford & Edwards, 1989 – USA
Scotinotylus alpigena (L. Koch, 1869) – Europe, Russia to Central Asia
Scotinotylus alpinus (Banks, 1896) – Russia, Mongolia, USA (Alaska), Canada, USA, Greenland
Scotinotylus altaicus Marusik, Hippa & Koponen, 1996 – Russia
Scotinotylus ambiguus Millidge, 1981 – USA, Canada
Scotinotylus amurensis Eskov & Marusik, 1994 – Russia
Scotinotylus antennatus (O. Pickard-Cambridge, 1875) (type) – Europe, Kazakhstan, Russia (South Siberia)
Scotinotylus apache (Chamberlin, 1949) – USA
Scotinotylus autor (Chamberlin, 1949) – USA
Scotinotylus bicavatus Millidge, 1981 – USA
Scotinotylus bodenburgi (Chamberlin & Ivie, 1947) – USA (Alaska)
Scotinotylus boreus Millidge, 1981 – Canada
Scotinotylus castoris (Chamberlin, 1949) – USA
Scotinotylus clavatus (Schenkel, 1927) – Switzerland, Austria
Scotinotylus columbia (Chamberlin, 1949) – Canada
Scotinotylus crinitis Millidge, 1981 – USA
Scotinotylus dubiosus Millidge, 1981 – USA
Scotinotylus eutypus (Chamberlin, 1949) – Russia (Siberia), Japan, North America
Scotinotylus evansi (O. Pickard-Cambridge, 1894) – Greenland, Europe, West Siberia
Scotinotylus exsectoides Millidge, 1981 – Canada
Scotinotylus formicarius (Dondale & Redner, 1972) – USA
Scotinotylus gracilis Millidge, 1981 – USA
Scotinotylus humilis Millidge, 1981 – USA
Scotinotylus kenus (Chamberlin, 1949) – USA
Scotinotylus kimjoopili Eskov & Marusik, 1994 – Russia
Scotinotylus kolymensis Eskov & Marusik, 1994 – Russia
Scotinotylus levii Marusik, 1988 – Russia
Scotinotylus majesticus (Chamberlin & Ivie, 1947) – Canada, USA
Scotinotylus millidgei Eskov, 1989 – Russia
Scotinotylus montanus Millidge, 1981 – USA
Scotinotylus pallidus (Emerton, 1882) – USA, Canada
Scotinotylus patellatus (Emerton, 1917) – Canada, USA
Scotinotylus pollucis Millidge, 1981 – USA
Scotinotylus protervus (L. Koch, 1879) – Russia, Kazakhstan, Mongolia, USA (Alaska), Canada
Scotinotylus provincialis Denis, 1949 – France
Scotinotylus provo (Chamberlin, 1949) – USA
Scotinotylus regalis Millidge, 1981 – USA
Scotinotylus sacer (Crosby, 1929) – Russia (Siberia), USA (Alaska), Canada, Greenland
Scotinotylus sacratus Millidge, 1981 – USA
Scotinotylus sagittatus Millidge, 1981 – USA
Scotinotylus sanctus (Crosby, 1929) – USA, Canada
Scotinotylus sintalutus Millidge, 1981 – Canada
Scotinotylus tianschanicus Tanasevitch, 1989 – Central Asia
Scotinotylus venetus (Thorell, 1875) – Italy
Scotinotylus vernalis (Emerton, 1882) – USA, Canada
Scotinotylus vettonicus Barrientos & Hernández-Corral, 2020 – Spain, France

See also
 List of Linyphiidae species (Q–Z)

References

Araneomorphae genera
Linyphiidae
Spiders of Asia
Spiders of North America